is a train station operated by JR Kyushu on the Kagoshima Main Line in Hakata-ku, Fukuoka City, Fukuoka Prefecture, Japan.

Lines

Layout
The station consists of one side and two island platforms serving five tracks.

Platforms

Adjacent stations

History 
1 July 1907: Kyushu Railways is nationalized. Japanese Government Railways (JGR) took over the control of the station.
12 October 1909: The station became part of the Hitoyoshi Main Line.
21 November 1909: The station became part of the Kagoshima Main Line. 
14 October 1960: Minami-Fukuoka train yard opened.
1 November 1966: Station renamed Minami-Fukuoka Station. This was due to users complaining that a nearby station on the Tenjin Ōmuta Line bore the same name.
1 April 1987: Privatization of Japanese National Railways (JNR), the successor to JGR Line. Control of the station passed to JR Kyushu.
1994: Station burned down in arson attack.
July 1999: Station rebuilt with automatic ticket gates.
2006: Elevators added to platforms.

Passenger statistics
In fiscal 2016, the station was used by 9,819 passengers daily, and it ranked 14th among the busiest stations of JR Kyushu.

Vicinity 
Lawson Convenience Store
Motomachi Shopping Street
JR Kyūshū train yard
 : Tenjin Ōmuta Line
NTT Building
Japan Ground Self-Defense Force, Camp Fukuoka (4th Division Headquarter)
Nakoku no okarekishi Park
Nishitetsu Bus station

See also 
List of railway stations in Japan

References

External links
Minami-Fukuoka Station (JR Kyushu)

Railway stations in Japan opened in 1890
Railway stations in Fukuoka Prefecture